The Liberal Democrat Conference, also known inside the party as the Liberal Democrat Federal Conference, is a twice-per-year political conference of the British Liberal Democrats, the third-largest political party in the UK by the number of votes cast. The Conference is typically held over three days in Spring and four in Autumn, during the party conference season, at a variety of venues (due to COVID-19, between Spring 2020 — Spring 2022 inclusive, as a primarily Online event). It culminates in a speech by the party's Leader. It is organised by the Federal Conference Committee, an internal body of the Liberal Democrats. Conference is the ultimate decision-making body of the Liberal Democrats, one of the few British political parties to use its annual gathering for voting and policy resolution. In contrast to the Labour Party Conference, where 50% of votes are allocated to affiliated organisations (such as trade unions), and in which all voting is restricted to nominated representatives (known as delegates), and the Conservative Party Conference, where votes are traditionally not held, every member of the Liberal Democrats who attends its Conference, either in-person or online, has the right to vote in policy debates, under a one member, one vote system. There are no 'weighted' votes reserved for the party's Elected Representatives, MPs, trade unions or for senior members of the party. A proposal can only become policy if Conference votes for it.

Conference also features speeches from prominent party members and guests and an exhibition.

There are also several fringe events, run by internal political groups such as Liberal Reform, Social Liberal Forum and Young Liberals, and a well-established late-evening entertainment review known as the Glee Club.
 
The Liberal Democrat Conference takes place twice per year, first as the Spring Conference, usually held in March, and then the Autumn Conference, usually in September.

The first Liberal Democrat Conference was held in Blackpool, in the North West of England, from 25 to 29 September 1988, with the most recent being the 68th Conference, mostly held online, from 11 to 13 March 2022. The 2020 Spring Conference, due to have been held in York from 13 to 15 March in that year, was cancelled due to fears about the COVID-19 pandemic.

In Autumn 2020, the same pandemic caused all three of Britain's largest political parties to hold 'virtual' conferences. During that period, the Liberal Democrats were the only one of the three to hold policy votes at its Conference: the Conservatives traditionally do not hold votes at their Conference, while Labour replaced its Conference with an event titled Labour Connected, at which no votes were held. The Liberal Democrats used electronic cards to enable party members to vote online.

The Liberal Democrat Conference is overseen by the Federal Conference Committee (FCC), which also selects motions and amendments for debates, runs Conference sessions and provides drafting advice and liaison. Its members are regularly elected and expected to be objective and fair in their selection of motions and amendments.

The Liberal Democrat Conference does not choose the Leader of the Liberal Democrats, who is instead elected by a party-wide ballot of all members in a one-member, one-vote contest. The system has been in use since the party's inception in 1988, which predates changes to internal party voting rules by both the Labour and the Conservative Parties. Neither Liberal Democrat MPs nor any other internal party groups have special voting rights over either party policy or in the election of the party Leader.

Conference Access Fund
 
The Conference Access Fund provides financial support for both low-income and disabled attendees. It offsets the costs of accommodation, childcare and travel for those on low incomes. For example, it provides £50 per night accommodation support on the understanding that the cheapest-available accommodation has been booked. It provides uncapped funding for disabled attendees. Members of the party directly contribute to the fund and are described as having donated "with generosity". The funding is ring-fenced. Among the three largest UK-wide parties, the Liberal Democrats are unique in providing an Access Fund that defrays costs for low-income and disabled Conference attendees.

Conference locations
 Conference is held twice per year, in Spring (usually March) and Autumn (September or early October). It is held in locations across England, Wales and Scotland, with Bournemouth and Brighton being the most frequently used venues. The duration is usually three to four days. The party's first Conference was held in Blackpool, in September 1988. All locations are accessible on public transport, by rail and road.

Motions
A Motion is put forward before each debate, and must be submitted to the party's Federal Conference Committee at least eight weeks before Conference. These are then published in the Conference Agenda. 

Any party member can submit a motion, with the support of at least 10 local party members. Any party member can also speak either for or against a Motion. The debate ends with a vote, open to all members at Conference. If a Motion is passed, it automatically becomes Lib Dem policy. Emergency Motions can be submitted until a few days before the start of Conference.

Federal Conference Committee

The Liberal Democrat conference agenda is decided by the Federal Conference Committee, a democratically elected body of party members and officials. The current membership, in surname order (other than the Chair and Vice Chair), after the most recent set of elections, in November 2022, is:

Federal Policy Committee

The Federal Policy Committee researches and develops party policy and oversees its policy-making process. At Conference, it provides policy papers for debate and compiles the election manifestos for both the Westminster and European elections.

The Committee elects a Conference Chair who is responsible for choosing speakers and trying to ensure balance between different viewpoints on the issues to be debated. He or she may also receive speaking requests from Elected Representatives and SAOs.

The current membership, in surname order (other than the Chair and Vice Chairs), after the most recent set of elections, in November 2019, is:

List of Liberal Democrat Conferences (1988 — present)

See also
 Liberal Reform
 Social Liberal Forum
 Young Liberals
 One member, one vote
 Party conference season
 Conservative Party Conference
 Labour Party Conference

References

External links

 Liberal Democrat Conference website
 
 Official website of the Liberal Democrats

Annual events in the United Kingdom
Conferences
Conferences in the United Kingdom
Liberal Democrats (UK)
Organisation of the Liberal Democrats (UK)
Political conferences
Political events
Political events in the United Kingdom
Political party assemblies
Recurring events established in 1988